Before is the seventh solo EP by English musician James Blake. It was released on 14 October 2020 by Republic and Polydor Records.

Track listing

Notes
  indicates a co-producer
  indicates an additional producer
  "I Keep Calling" samples "Falling Apart", written by Charlotte Day Wilson, Matthew Tavares, and Thomas Paxton-Beesley, and performed by Charlotte Day Wilson.

Personnel
Credits adapted from Tidal.

 James Blake – vocals , engineer , mixer , programming 
 Carl Bespolka – engineer 
 Josh Stadlen – piano 
 Peter Lee Johnson – violin , strings 
 Nico Muhly – string arranger 
 Nathan Schram – viola

References

2020 EPs
James Blake (musician) albums
Albums produced by James Blake (musician)

EPs by English artists